Highway 699 is a highway in the west-central region of the Canadian province of Saskatchewan. It runs from Highway 21 to Highway 55.

The western end of Highway 699 begins at Highway 21 near Ministikwan Lake and then passes through the villages of Whelan and Loon Lake as it heads east. The highway provides access to Murphy Lake, Fowler Lake, Makwa Lake, Jumbo Lake, Little Jumbo Lake, Makwa Sahgaiehcan First Nation, and the provincial parks of Makwa Lake and Steele Narrows. The last community that Highway 699 passes through after Highway 26 is Loon River, which is near its terminus at Highway 55.

See also 
Roads in Saskatchewan
Transportation in Saskatchewan

References 

699